Ian McGraw (30 August 1926 – October 2014) was a Scottish footballer, who played as a goalkeeper for Arbroath and Leicester City. He was part of the Leicester squad that reached the 1949 FA Cup Final, but McGraw missed the game due to injury.

References

External links

1926 births
2014 deaths
Footballers from Glasgow
Scottish footballers
Association football goalkeepers
Rutherglen Glencairn F.C. players
Arbroath F.C. players
Leicester City F.C. players
Corby Town F.C. players
English Football League players
Scottish Junior Football Association players